Kapsan County is a kun, or county, in Ryanggang Province, North Korea.  During the Chosŏn Dynasty, officials who had fallen into disfavour were often sent into internal exile there.

Geography
Kapsan lies on the eastern edge of the Kaema Plateau.  The highest peak is Tongjomryongsan (동점령산, 2113 m).   Although the majority of the county's area is mountainous, the terrain slopes downward toward the center and the Kapsan Basin.  The county's chief stream is the Hochon River (허천강).  Cultivation is largely restricted to the basin and river valley. Some 85% of the county's area is forestland. Due to its location on the Kaema Plateau, Kapsan has a severely cold continental climate.

Administrative divisions
Kapsan county is divided into 1 ŭp (town). 4 rodongjagu (workers' districts) and 20 ri (villages):

Economy
The chief local industry is agriculture; major crops include rice (raised along the Hochon), as well as potatoes, hops, and honey. The 5.1 Workers' District (오일로동자구) specializes in hops production; these "5.1 Hops" are exported to other countries. Lumbering also plays a role, thanks to the extensive forests. There are various mineral deposits in the county, including lodes of copper, coal and copper pyrite.

Transportation
There is a cable car railway in the county with a length of 70-ri (27.4 km); it is by this method that coal is brought from Kapsan mine to the train station in Kumdok to be loaded to be smelted.

Kapsan County has a 10-ri (3.9 km) long trolleybus line at a mining village, however it is not specified which particular area it is in.

History
During the Korean War (1950-1953), South Korean guerrillas passed word to United Nations forces that a large number of top North Korean Communist leaders planned to gather in Kapsan in October 1951. Based on this information, on 30 October eight AD Skyraider bombers from United States Navy VF-54 and eight ADs from VA-728 escorted by four F2-H2s from VF-172, eight F4U-4s from VF-53, eight F4U-4s from VF-713 and four F9-F2s from VF-831 attacked their meeting place with 1,000-pound (454-kg) bombs and napalm. Intelligence evaluation indicated that the attack killed 500 Communists.

See also

Geography of North Korea
Administrative divisions of North Korea
Kapsan Faction Incident

References

External links

Counties of Ryanggang